Black Star Square, also known as Independence Square, is a public square in Accra, Ghana, bordered by the Accra Sports Stadium and the Kwame Nkrumah Memorial Park. The square often hosts the annual independence celebrations as well as other national events. It is currently the site for all civic and military parades in Ghana. It was completed in the year 1961, which coincided with the state visit of Queen Elizabeth II to Ghana. The Black Star Square is sited between  The 28th February Road  and The Accra's Southern Coastline. Also the public square is one of the largest in the world

History 

In 1957, Kwame Nkrumah became the first prime minister and president of Gold Coast, now Ghana after gaining independence from the British. Kwame Nkrumah commissioned the construction of the square to celebrate the nation's independence. It coincided with the visit of Queen Elizabeth II. Construction ended in 1961, and it was named Black Star Square. Kwame Nkrumah was the one who led Ghana, formerly Gold Coast to gain independence from Britain.

Importance 

Black Star Square is a site for Ghana's Independence Day parade, which falls on the 6th of March every year. A particularly notable parade was the Golden Jubilee, which was Ghana's 50th anniversary of independence from British colonial rule. The Golden Jubilee celebration occurred on March 6, 2007 and it was led by President John Kuffour.  It also hosts all major national public gatherings and national festivals. Every visitor is free to take pictures of buildings, including the Black Star Gate.

Structure 

In Independence Square are stands that can seat 30,000 people. The square boasts three monuments that encapsulate the fight for independence and liberation. This includes the Independence Arch, the Liberation Day Monument, and the Black Star Gate, also known as the Black Star Monument. A statue of a soldier facing the Independence Arch symbolizes the Ghanaians who lost their lives fighting for Ghana's independence.

Major Events 
 On March 24, 1998, over 500,000 people gathered at the square to welcome former U.S. President Bill Clinton and his wife, Hillary Clinton. This event marked the first U.S. president to visit Ghana.
 On August 10, 2012, the state funeral of late President John Atta Mills was held at the square.
 On November 18, 2012, the state funeral the late former Vice-President Aliu Mahama was held at the square.
 On January 27, 2021, the state funeral of late former President Jerry Rawlings took place at the square.

References

External links 

Squares in Ghana
National squares
Accra
Independence
Kwame Nkrumah